Cook Strait News was a free community newspaper in Wellington, New Zealand, which covered the Eastern and Southern suburbs of the city. It was published between 5 April 1994 and 13 June 2006.

According to a 2012 ABC audit, Cook Strait News printed 25,456 copies weekly. The deadline for the newspaper was on Friday afternoons with it being delivered throughout the area on Mondays.

It was part of Wellington Suburban Newspapers which is owned by Blenheim-based published Les Whiteside and his wife Katrina. Wellington Suburban Newspapers also publish the Independent Herald and the Wainuiomata News.

References

External links
 Cook Strait News Online Website

Newspapers published in New Zealand
Weekly newspapers
Publications with year of establishment missing
Mass media in Wellington